Kaouther Mohamed Belkebir (born 5 August 2003) is an Algerian fencer. She is ranked 22nd internationally, and represented her country at the 2020 Olympics.

Career 
She was a bronze medalist at the 2019 African Fencing Championships in Bamako.

In April 2021, she won the African Olympic Qualification Tournament in Cairo, thus qualifying for the Tokyo Olympic Games.

2020 Tokyo Summer Olympics 
Belkebir represented Algeria at the 2020 Tokyo Summer Olympics, competing against China's Yang Hengyu at the Women's Sabre Individual event. She ranked 35th.

References

External links

2003 births
Living people
Algerian female sabre fencers
Olympic fencers of Algeria
Fencers at the 2020 Summer Olympics
Mediterranean Games competitors for Algeria
Competitors at the 2022 Mediterranean Games
21st-century Algerian women